Donnell is an unincorporated community in Jefferson County, in the U.S. state of Missouri.

The community has the name of Eli Donnell, an early settler.

References

Unincorporated communities in Jefferson County, Missouri
Unincorporated communities in Missouri